Tomás Franco Tavares (born 7 March 2001) is a Portuguese professional footballer who plays as a right-back for Russian Premier League club Spartak Moscow.

Club career

Benfica 
Tavares started his football career in Benfica's youth system. He signed his first professional contract with the club on 2 July 2018. He made his professional debut with Benfica B in a 2–1 LigaPro win over Oliveirense on 23 August 2019.

On 10 September 2019, Tavares debuted for the first team as a starter in a 2–1 home loss to RB Leipzig in the UEFA Champions League. He made his Primeira Liga debut as a 12th-minute substitute in a 1–0 home win over Vitória de Setúbal on 28 September.

Loan to Alavés 
On 3 October 2020, Tavares was loaned to La Liga side Deportivo Alavés for the 2020–21 season. He made his first league appearance in a home match against Barcelona after coming as a substitute for Édgar Méndez in the second half. On 15 January 2021, Deportivo Alavés terminated the loan of Tavares, and he returned to Benfica.

Loan to Farense 
On 18 January 2021, Tavares moved to Primeira Liga club Farense on a loan until the end of the season.

Basel 
On 31 August 2021 Basel announced that they had signed Tavares on a one year loan with an option to for a definite move. Tavares joined Basel's first team for their 2021–22 season under head coach Patrick Rahmen. Tavares played his domestic league debut for the club in the away game in the Cornaredo on 12 September 2021 as Basel played a 1–1 with Lugano. He scored his first goal for the club in the home game in the St. Jakob-Park on 26 September 2021. It was the second goal of the game as Basel won 3–1 against Zürich.

Basel pulled the option to buy the player definitively. On 8 May 2022 during the match against Lausanne-Sport in the Stade de la Tuilière Tavares injured himself.

Spartak Moscow
In January 2023, Tavares signed for Russian Premier League club Spartak Moscow on a three-and-a-half year deal. He made his official debut on 23 February 2023 in a 0-1 cup win against Lokomotiv Moscow.

International career
Tavares is a youth international for Portugal, having represented the nation's under-19 team.

Personal life
Born in Peniche, Portugal, Tavares is of Cape Verdean descent.

Career statistics

References

External links
 
 
 

2001 births
Living people
People from Peniche, Portugal
Black Portuguese sportspeople
Portuguese people of Cape Verdean descent
Association football defenders
Portuguese footballers
Liga Portugal 2 players
Primeira Liga players
Swiss Super League players
Russian Premier League players
S.L. Benfica B players
S.L. Benfica footballers
Deportivo Alavés players
S.C. Farense players
FC Basel players
FC Spartak Moscow players
Portugal youth international footballers
Portuguese expatriate footballers
Portuguese expatriate sportspeople in Spain
Expatriate footballers in Spain
Portuguese expatriate sportspeople in Switzerland
Expatriate footballers in Switzerland
Portuguese expatriate sportspeople in Russia
Expatriate footballers in Russia
Sportspeople from Leiria District